Parunovo is a rural locality (a village) in Osintsevskoye Rural Settlement, Kishertsky District, Perm Krai, Russia. The population was 135 as of 2010.

Geography 
Parunovo is located on the Gryazushka River, 30 km southeast of Ust-Kishert (the district's administrative centre) by road. Savyata is the nearest rural locality.

References 

Rural localities in Kishertsky District